Persepolis Qaem Shahr Football Club is an Iranian football club based in Qaem Shahr, Iran. It currently competes in the Mazandaran Provincial League. On September 25, 2012; Persepolis Qaem Shahr's chairman signed a contract with Rouyanian, the chairman of Persepolis, establishing Persepolis Qaem Shahr as one of Persepolis's sections.

The Academy

Current squad

First-team squad
Head Coach: Farhad Kochak Zadeh

U-23
Head Coach:

U-20
Head Coach:

U-17
Head Coach:

U-14
Head Coach:

Season-by-season
The table below shows the achievements of the club in various competitions.

See also

 Persepolis F.C. Academy
 Iran Football's 3rd Division 2010–11

References

Football clubs in Iran
Association football clubs established in 1990
1990 establishments in Iran
Persepolis F.C.
Football clubs in Qaem Shahr